Cornel Gheorghe (born 21 March 1971) is a Romanian figure skating coach and former competitor. He competed at the 1994 Winter Olympics, where he placed 14th, and at the 1998 Winter Olympics, where he placed 21st.

Gheorghe retired from competition in 2000 and turned to coaching. He coached Adrian Matei and Zolt Kosz, among others. He is also a technical specialist for Romania.

Programs

Results
GP: Champions Series (Grand Prix)

References

External links

 Figure skating corner profile

Romanian male single skaters
Living people
1971 births
Sportspeople from Galați
International Skating Union technical specialists
Olympic figure skaters of Romania
Figure skaters at the 1998 Winter Olympics
Figure skaters at the 1994 Winter Olympics
Universiade medalists in figure skating
Universiade silver medalists for Romania
Competitors at the 1997 Winter Universiade
Competitors at the 1999 Winter Universiade